The India women's national ice hockey team is the ice hockey team representing India internationally in women's competition. The team is overseen by the Ice Hockey Association of India, a member of the International Ice Hockey Federation. The team was formed in 2016 and currently competes in the IIHF Women's Challenge Cup of Asia Division I tournament.

History
The India women's national ice hockey team played its first game in March 2016 at the 2016 IIHF Women's Challenge Cup of Asia Division I tournament. In their opening game of the tournament India lost 1–8 to Singapore. India went on to lose their other three games of the tournament to Chinese Taipei, Malaysia and Thailand, finishing in last place with zero points. Their 0–13 loss to Chinese Taipei at the tournament was their biggest defeat in international competition at the time. At the end of the tournament Noor Jahan was named best goaltender by the media.

International competitions
2016 IIHF Women's Challenge Cup of Asia Division I. Finish: 5th (5th overall)
2017 IIHF Women's Challenge Cup of Asia. Finish: 4th
2018 IIHF Women's Challenge Cup of Asia Division I. Finish: 4th (8th overall)
2019 IIHF Women's Challenge Cup of Asia Division I. Finish: 3rd (8th overall)

Players and personnel

Team roster
For the 2019 IIHF Women's Challenge Cup of Asia Division I

Team staff
For the 2019 IIHF Women's Challenge Cup of Asia Division I
Head coach: Darrin Harrold
General manager: Amit Belwal
Assistant coach: Tsewang Gyaltson
Team leader: Harjinder Singh
Team staff: Navin Rishi
Team doctor: Simrat Sharma

All-time record against other nations
Last match update: 15 March 2022

References

External links
 Ice Hockey Association of india

Ice hockey in India
Ice hockey
Women's national ice hockey teams in Asia